Valentyn Viktorovych Platonov (born 15 January 1977 in Kryvyi Rih) is a retired Ukrainian professional footballer.

References

External links

1977 births
Living people
Sportspeople from Kryvyi Rih
Ukrainian footballers
Ukraine under-21 international footballers
Association football defenders
FC Khimik Severodonetsk players
FC Metalurh Novomoskovsk players
FC Dnipro players
FC Kryvbas Kryvyi Rih players
FC Mariupol players
FC Zorya Luhansk players
FC Vorskla Poltava players
FC Hoverla Uzhhorod players
FC Hirnyk Kryvyi Rih players
FC Helios Kharkiv players
FC Elektrometalurh-NZF Nikopol players
Ukrainian Premier League players
Ukrainian football managers